Goin may refer to:

 Goin (grape) or Gouais blanc, a grape variety
 Goin, Moselle, France
 Suzanne Goin, American chef and restauranteur

See also
 Goins (surname)
 Góinn, one of the serpents beneath Yggdrasil in Norse mythology